Chisago County is a county in the U.S. state of Minnesota. As of the 2020 census, the population was 56,621. Its county seat is Center City.

Chisago County is part of the Minneapolis-St. Paul-Bloomington, MN-WI Metropolitan Statistical Area.

History
Chisago County was organized on September 1, 1851. It took its name from Chisago Lake. Swedish immigrants were the predominant group in Chisago County from the early to late 1800s, and strongly influenced the county's religious and cultural development. The county has retained and continues to celebrate much of its Swedish heritage.

Geography

Chisago County lies on Minnesota's eastern border, abutting the western border of Wisconsin (across the Saint Croix River). The Saint Croix flows south-southeast along the county's eastern border. The Sunrise River flows north through the county's central part, collecting the waters of the North Branch Sunrise River and Hay Creek before discharging into the St. Croix at the county's eastern boundary. The county terrain consists of rolling hills, devoted to agriculture. The terrain slopes to the south and east, with its highest point near the northwest corner, at 1,017' (310m) ASL.

Major highways

  Interstate 35
  US Highway 8
  US Highway 61
  Minnesota State Highway 95
  Minnesota State Highway 243
 List of county roads

Adjacent counties

 Pine County - north
 Burnett County, Wisconsin - northeast
 Polk County, Wisconsin - east
 Washington County - south
 Anoka County - southwest
 Isanti County - west
 Kanabec County - northwest

Protected areas

 Fish Lake County Park
 Franconia Bluffs Scientific and Natural Area
 Interstate State Park
 Lawrence Creek Scientific and Natural Area
 Ojiketa Regional Park
 Saint Croix National Scenic Riverway (part)
 Wild River State Park

Climate and weather

Demographics

2020 census
As of the census of 2020, there were 56,621 people and 20,370 households. 95.4% of residents had at least a high school education, and 22.2% had attained a Bachelor's degree or higher. 4.9% were veterans.

97.9% of residents were born in the United States, and 78.5% had been born in Minnesota. Among the foreign-born population, 56.5% were naturalized US citizens. 97.1% of residents spoke only English at home.

The racial makeup of the county was 89.8% White alone (95.5% White alone or in combination), 1.5% Black, 1.4% Asian, 0.6% Native American, and 0.9% some other race. 4.9% were two or more races. 2.56% of residents were Hispanic of any race. The most common ancestries in Chisago County were German (33.4%), Swedish (15.8%), Norwegian (13.0%), Irish (9.7%), and English (5.4%).

Among workers 16 years and older, 80.3% commuted to work via car, 9.0% carpooled, 1.6% used public transit, and 2.2% walked, biked, or used some other method. 7.0% worked from home. The median household income in Chisago County was $86,900, slightly above the state average. 6.4% of residents lived below the poverty line, and 2.5% were unemployed. 86.4% of housing in the county was owner-occupied.

The average family size in Chisago County was 3.05 persons, and 62.2% of households were married-couple families.

2010 census
As of the 2010 census, there were 53,887 people, 19,470 households, and 14,389 families in the county. The population density was 130/sqmi (50.1/km2). There were 21,172 housing units at an average density of 51.0/sqmi (19.7/km2). The racial makeup of the county was 95.80% White, 1.20% Black or African American, 0.60% Native American, 0.90% Asian, 0.01% Pacific Islander, 0.30% from other races, and 1.20% from two or more races. 1.50% of the population were Hispanic or Latino of any race.

There were 19,470 households, out of which 37.20% had children under the age of 18 living with them, 61.00% were married couples living together, 7.90% had a female householder with no husband present, and 26.10% were non-families. 20.30% of all households were made up of individuals, and 8.60% had someone living alone who was 65 years of age or older. The average household size was 2.68 and the average family size was 3.09.

The county population contained 25.70% under the age of 18, 7.30% from 18 to 24, 26.80% from 25 to 44, 28.60% from 45 to 64, and 11.60% who were 65 years of age or older. The median age was 39 years. For every 100 females there were 101.60 males. For every 100 females age 18 and over, there were 101.50 males. The per capita income for the county was $29,293. About 6.20% of the population was below the poverty line.

2000 census
As of the 2000 census, there were 41,101 people, 14,454 households, and 11,086 families in the county. The population density was 99.0/sqmi (38.2/km2). The racial makeup of the county was 97.21% White, 0.51% Black or African American, 0.45% Native American, 0.70% Asian, 0.03% Pacific Islander, 0.31% from other races, and 0.80% from two or more races. 1.15% of the population were Hispanic or Latino of any race. 31.3% were of German, 18.1% Swedish, 11.3% Norwegian and 6.9% Irish ancestry.

There were 14,454 households, out of which 41.00% had children under the age of 18 living with them, 64.50% were married couples living together, 8.00% had a female householder with no husband present, and 23.30% were non-families. 18.40% of all households were made up of individuals, and 7.40% had someone living alone who was 65 years of age or older. The average household size was 2.79 and the average family size was 3.18.

The county population contained 30.20% under the age of 18, 7.10% from 18 to 24, 32.20% from 25 to 44, 20.70% from 45 to 64, and 9.80% who were 65 years of age or older. The median age was 34 years. For every 100 females there were 103.90 males. For every 100 females age 18 and over, there were 101.70 males.

The median income for a household in the county was $52,012, and the median income for a family was $57,335. Males had a median income of $40,743 versus $27,653 for females. The per capita income for the county was $21,013. About 3.20% of families and 5.10% of the population were below the poverty line, including 5.40% of those under age 18 and 8.00% of those age 65 or over.

Education
 Chisago Lakes High School
 North Branch Area High School
 Rush City High School

Communities

Cities

 Center City (county seat)
 Chisago City
 Harris
 Lindström
 North Branch
 Rush City
 Shafer
 Stacy
 Taylors Falls
 Wyoming

Unincorporated communities

 Almelund
 Franconia
 Palmdale
 Rush Point
 Stark
 Sunrise

Townships

 Amador Township
 Chisago Lake Township
 Fish Lake Township
 Franconia Township
 Lent Township
 Nessel Township
 Rushseba Township
 Shafer Township
 Sunrise Township
 Wyoming Township (former, now defunct)

Arts and culture
Chisago County is strongly influenced by the German, Swedish and Norwegian immigrants who settled there in the mid-19th century. It provided the setting for much of Swedish author Vilhelm Moberg's suite of novels The Emigrants in the 1950s, and Moberg engaged in both archival and oral history research for his books to recreate the early Swedish immigration in the area. Sculptor Ian Dudley's bronze statue of Moberg stands in Chisago City's park. His fictional characters Karl-Oskar and Kristina Nilsson from Ljuder parish in Småland settled around the Lake Ki-Chi-Saga (from the Ojibwe language Ki-chi-saga-igun (Gichi-zaaga'igan in the contemporary spelling) meaning "Big Lake-with-an-outlet," which was later shortened to Lake Chisago). The early settlers' heritage is still honored by the annual Karl Oskar Days in Lindström.

Government and politics
Chisago County has trended conservative in recent state and federal elections, backing every Republican nominee for president since 2000.

See also
 National Register of Historic Places listings in Chisago County, Minnesota
 Swedish Americans

References

External links

 
 Chisago County Historical Society website
 Minnesota DOT Highway map of Chisago County

 
1851 establishments in Minnesota Territory
Minnesota placenames of Native American origin
Minneapolis–Saint Paul
Minnesota counties
Populated places established in 1851